The Raycom All-Star Classic was a postseason college football all-star game, the only edition of which took place in 2013. The game was played in Montgomery, Alabama, at the Cramton Bowl and was telecast by CBS Sports Network.

History
Montgomery's Cramton Bowl stadium had hosted the Blue–Gray Football Classic from 1939 to 2001, and the stadium was renovated in 2011.  With Raycom Media as a sponsor, the All-Star Classic provided seniors not playing in the Senior Bowl with an opportunity to be seen by scouts in advance of the 2013 NFL Draft. Ten players in the game were eventually drafted.

In August 2013, city officials announced that a new traditional bowl game would be played in Montgomery, starting in 2014, between teams from the Sun Belt Conference and Mid-American Conference. As that game, the Camellia Bowl, would be sponsored by Raycom Media and played at the Cramton Bowl, the All-Star Classic was discontinued.

Game results

Head coaches
2013 – Jim Bates (Stars) and Dan Reeves (Stripes)

2013: Stripes 31, Stars 3

MVPs
 2013 – Michael Hill (RB, Missouri Western) and Charles James (DB, Charleston Southern)

See also
List of college bowl games

References

External links
  from March 2013 via Wayback Machine
  via Wayback Machine
  via Wayback Machine
 
 

College football all-star games
American football competitions in Alabama
Sports in Montgomery, Alabama
2013 establishments in Alabama
2013 in sports in Alabama